A New Dope is the fourth studio album by Boston underground hip hop duo 7L & Esoteric. Released on June 27, 2006, the album featured primarily electro-influenced production rather than the boom bap sound typical of their other albums. The album features only one guest appearance, which is Kool Keith's guest verse on the track Daisycutta.

Track listing

References

7L & Esoteric albums
2006 albums